Fintecna, is an Italian state-owned financial management company which specialises in the valorisation and divestment by privatization of real estate. The company is fully controlled by the Ministry of the Economy and Finance.

References

Financial services companies established in 1993